Mary Lynn Twombly Aprahamian (born 8 January 1935) is an American composer, conductor, and pianist who publishes under the name Mary Lynn Twombly.

Twombly was born in New York. From 1952 to 1954, she studied with Meyer Kupferman at Sarah Lawrence College; from 1954 to 1958 with Vittorio Giannini at the Manhattan School of Music; and from 1971 to 1972, she studied electronic music with Elias Tanenbaum. In 1973 she attended music workshops at Fairleigh Dickinson University.

Twombly received the Harold Bauer Piano Award from the Manhattan School of Music in 1957. She received at least one commission from the Little Orchestra Society in 1960, possibly for Alice in Wonderland, which was published and performed in New York that year. She conducted and composed music for films and recordings for Weston Woods Studios from 1966 to 1967. She was a member of the American Society of Composers, Authors, and Publishers (ASCAP).

Twombly's compositions include:

Ballet 

Alice in Wonderland (with optional narrator; choreography by Herta Payson)

Operetta 

Little Match Girl
Who Are The Blind?

Orchestra 

Symphonic Statements (piano and string orchestra)

Vocal 

Eternal Word (narrator, chorus and orchestra)
Songs of Christmas (chorus)

References 

American women composers
1935 births
Living people
Sarah Lawrence College alumni
Manhattan School of Music alumni
Musicians from New York (state)
ASCAP composers and authors